General Deepak Kapoor PVSM, AVSM, SM, VSM, ADC (b. 1948) served as the 22nd Chief of the Army Staff of the Indian Army, appointed on 30 September 2007 and Chairman of the Chiefs of Staff Committee appointed on 31 August 2009.

Biography
Kapoor was commissioned into the Regiment of Artillery on 11 June 1967. He is an alumnus of Sainik School, Kunjpura; National Defence Academy Khadakwasla (30th Course) and Indian Military Academy, Dehradun. His career in the Indian Army spans four decades, during which he has held varied command and as well as staff appointments. A veteran of the 1971 Indo-Pak War in the eastern theatre (Bangladesh), he is an alumnus of the Defence Services Staff College in Wellington and has completed the Higher Command Course at Army War College, Mhow and the National Defence College course at the National Defence College in New Delhi. He served as the Chief Operations Officer for UNOSOM II (United Nations Operation in Somalia II) during 1994-95 and was awarded the Vishisht Seva Medal in January 1996.

Kapoor commanded the 161 Infantry Brigade in Uri, Jammu & Kashmir which was actively involved in operations along the Line of Control. For his performance he was awarded the Sena Medal in January 1998. He commanded the 22nd Mountain Division as part of a Strike Corps during Operation Parakram in 2001-02. He was thereafter deeply involved in counter insurgency operations combating the insurgency in Assam, as Chief of Staff of 4 Corps in Tezpur. On promotion to Lieutenant General, he commanded 33 Corps at Siliguri, West Bengal. For his service as a Corps Commander, he was awarded the Ati Vishisht Seva Medal in January 2006. On elevation to the appointment of Army Commander, he commanded the Army Training Command (ARTRAC) in Shimla. Thereafter he moved to spearhead the Northern Command (India), the largest operational command in the Indian Army, deployed over varied terrain and was once again actively involved in COIN operations. For his performance, he was awarded the Param Vishisht Seva Medal in January 2007.

Kapoor was appointed as the Honorary Aide-De-Camp to the Supreme Commander of the Armed Forces, the President of India. He was also the senior Colonel Commandant of the Regiment of Artillery. Kapoor was Vice-Chief of the Army before taking over as the Chief of Army Staff.

Personal life
Kapoor holds Master's Degrees in Political Science, Military Science and Business Administration, the latter which he completed at the Indira Gandhi National Open University in New Delhi. He also holds a diploma in Business Management. He is married to Kirti Kapoor and they have two children - a daughter and a son, both of whom are married.

Major Decorations and Badges
Param Vishisht Seva Medal
Ati Vishisht Seva Medal
Sena Medal
Vishisht Seva Medal

Awards

Conroversies
General Deepak Kapoor was found guilty in Adarsh Housing Society scam through departmental enquiry  along with 7 other officers in 2017 due to which he is barred from holding any official post.

Dates of rank

References

|-

1948 births
Living people
Chiefs of Army Staff (India)
Military personnel from Punjab, India
Sainik School alumni
Indira Gandhi National Open University alumni
Recipients of the Param Vishisht Seva Medal
Punjabi people
Vice Chiefs of Army Staff (India)
Recipients of the Sena Medal
Indian generals
National Defence College, India alumni
Recipients of the Ati Vishisht Seva Medal
Recipients of the Vishisht Seva Medal
Army War College, Mhow alumni
Defence Services Staff College alumni